AHRR may refer to:
 Aryl hydrocarbon receptor repressor, gene
 Cytochrome P450, family 1, member A1, enzyme